Dept. H is an American comic book series created by Matt Kindt and published through Dark Horse Comics. The first issue, released on April 20, 2016, sold an estimated 9300 copies. According to the review aggregation website Comic Book Roundup, it received mostly positive reviews, averaging 8.6/10 based on 24 reviews from critics.

The story is about a suspicious death in an underwater research laboratory and the subsequent investigation led by the victim's daughter.

Collected editions

Film adaptation
On September 28, 2021, it was announced that streaming service Netflix was developing a film adaptation of the comic book series to be directed by Alice Waddington.

References

Dark Horse Comics titles
2016 comics debuts